The Preppie Murder is an American television film directed by John Herzfeld, written by Herzfeld and Irv Roud, and starring William Baldwin as Robert Chambers and Lara Flynn Boyle as Jennifer Levin. The film aired on ABC in 1989. It was based on the events of a murder committed by Robert Chambers, nicknamed the "Preppie Killer". The film co-stars Danny Aiello, Joanna Kerns, and William Devane.

Plot 
The film reenacts Robert Chambers' murder of Jennifer Levin. Robert Chambers, a man who attended prep schools on a scholarship, kills Jennifer Levin, who herself was of a privileged background after they leave a trendy Manhattan bar together. When Detective Mike Sheehan arrests him, Chambers claims that he killed her in self-defense after rough sex got out of hand. In the ensuing trial, Chambers' attorney, Jack Litman, attacks Levin's personal history. Chambers eventually pleads guilty to a lesser charge of manslaughter.

Cast 
 Danny Aiello as Detective Mike Sheehan
 William Baldwin as Robert Chambers
 Joanna Kerns as Linda Fairstein
 Lara Flynn Boyle as Jennifer Levin
 Dorothy Fielding as Phyllis Chambers
 James Handy as Detective Joe Brady Quinn
 William Devane as Jack Litman

Production 
The film was shot mostly in Los Angeles, but some exterior shots took place in New York City. Mike Sheehan, who investigated the case, served as a consultant. Jennifer Levin's parents declined involvement; her father called it "exploitative". Linda Fairstein and Jack Litman also declined involvement. Director John Herzfeld wanted to tell Jennifer Levin's story and "clear a little of the mud off her".

Release 
The Preppie Murder aired September 24, 1989, on ABC. It was released on home video in November 1993.

Reception 
Howard Rosenberg of the Los Angeles Times called it "vexing, powerful and heartbreaking—yet strangely enigmatic". John Leonard of New York called it "pointless" and compared it negatively to Linda Wolfe's book, Wasted: The Preppie Murder. John J. O'Connor of The New York Times wrote that the film's denunciation of the press as exploitative was ironic, as it "merely warms up the old headlines it pretends to abhor."

References

Further reading

External links 

1989 television films
1989 films
American television films
Films directed by John Herzfeld
Films set in 1986
Films shot in Los Angeles
Films shot in New York City
Crime films based on actual events
1980s English-language films